Antonio Caro (10 December 1950 – 29 March 2021) was a Colombian conceptual artist who created works since the late 1960s. He typically used non-traditional forms to create politically and socially charged critiques of Colombian issues. He died in Bogotá on 29 March 2021.

Biography 
He is a contemporary artist known for using conceptualizations and iconic visuals that often make political commentary about his home country.  Since 1970, Caro has built a career that, according to the categorizations of history and criticism, denotes an authentic example of conceptual art in Colombia. Since then, Caro's work has proposed a critical eye on social and political conditions in his country, as to their academic and popularly understood historical connotations. Caro's work is achieved through the implementation of informal procedures in traditional artistic practice, including photocopying, public installations, lectures, posters, and materials related to indigenous cultural practices, such as salt or achiote. The vast majority of his work makes use of text as a tool to communicate strong messages, but instead acquires the paradoxical nuances of a political nature as a means of production and dissemination. One may classify Caro's art as politically charged pop art.  In 1998, Caro received the prestigious Guggenheim Fellowship.

Some of his important works include: Sal (1971), Imperialism is a paper tiger (1972), "aquinocabeelarte" (art does not fit here) (1972), There is no case (1974), Colombia-Marlboro (1975), Colombia-Coca Cola (1977), Defend your talent (1977), "Todo está muy Caro" (Everything is too expensive) (1978), Homage to Manuel Quintin Lame (1979), Project 500 (1987), Onoto, among others.

Style 
Caro`s unique artistic style took on many forms throughout his career. However several key stylistic concepts have stayed with him throughout the years. One being Caro`s use of unusual materials. Ranging from metal, cardstock, salt and poster board Caro`s choice in material has never been that of traditional art. Likewise Caro has been a strong advocate against traditional art forms and throughout his career found ways to stray away from the typical. Lastly Caro`s most unique stylistic characteristic is his passion for creating art with a social or political message. Nearly all of Caro`s works are a political or social critique regarding what he believed to be important global and strictly Colombian issues.

Early career 
Caro first became interested in art at the age of 16, while still in high school. He attributed his early interest in art to two specific pieces the Tributo de los Artistas Colombians a Dante [A Tribute by Colombian Artists to Dante] and Espacios Ambientales [Environmental Spaces]. Caro personally regarded these artworks as crucial to the formation of his style as an artist because they both conveyed concise conceptual messages, important to certain social and political topics. As a result of Caro`s new found passion he decided to admit himself into the Universidad Nacional de Colombia in Bogota as a Fine Art student shortly after completing high school. However, despite his intense passion for art he dropped out of the university, attributing his lack of academic success to his inability to complete the general curriculum. Despite this, his time at the Universidad Nacional de Colombia brought him closer to political movements that he was interested in as well as brought him an influential mentor, Bernado Salcedo. According to Caro, Salcedo was his most influential role model. Together they became pivotal founders in the Colombian conceptual art movement. Salcedo introduced Caro to text based art in the late 1960s inspiring him to create SAL. A text based piece of the word sal [Spanish for salt] made from salt. The work was presented in Cali, at the Primera Bienal Americana de Artes Gráficas in 1971. SAL was one of the first of its kind in Colombia and naturally it aroused critics who claimed artwork lacked a standing in traditional forms. The criticism brought on Caro and Salcedo in the early 1970s inspired them to produce more idea based works rooted in Colombian social issues. As a result, the movement Caro and Salcedo had established in Colombia began to grow apart from conceptual art movements of the same time period in other Latin American countries.

Formative period artworks

Cabeza de Lleras
Presented in October 1970 at the XXI Salón Nacional de Artistas that took place at the Museo Nacional in Bogotá. The piece is typicb (1966–70). The work is a bust made from salt that is seen wearing a pair of glasses encased in a glass container on a pedestal. Water gallery floor to symbolize a denunciatory act on the hegemonic values of society. The result created by the artwork prompted journalist Alegre Levy to state  “¡Se inundó el salon!” [The Salon Flooded!] in her article in Bogotá’s major daily newspaper El Tiempo. A saying which has stuck with the piece ever since.

Interpretation of Cabeza de Lleras
During the 1960s into the late 1970s Colombian political group El Frente Nacional took power over the Conservative and Liberal Parties of Colombia. The group claimed to be a unifying force between the opposing interests which had devastated the country in the previous decades. El Frente Nacional however proved to be an oligarchy made from important business interests and Catholic Church authorities. The group had essentially filled the vacuum of power left being by the warring Conservatives and Liberals of Colombia and instead established their own tyrannical state under a pretext of democracy. Caro`s work captures a representation of one of the early presidents of the group, Carlos Lleras Restrepo. Cabeza de Lleras was made to capture both the insufficiencies and weaknesses of the political hierarchy Lleras represented as well as the cultural destruction and undermining that was beginning to take place. The salt which makes up the bust of Lleras represented both the weakness of the current government according to Caro as well as the cultural traditions of the Chibcha indigenous civilization. In the original title, Homenaje tardío de sus amigos y amigas de Zipaquirá, Manaure y Galerazamba [Late Homage From his Friends of Zipaquirá, Manaure and Galerazamba] the three cities mentioned Zipaquirá, Manaure and Galerazamba are Colombian cities known for their ancient salt mining industries. Furthermore, the water poured into the venue according to Caro established the ever-present waters of history which were to eventually dissolve the tyrannical hierarchy of oppression and along with it the cultural backbone of Colombia.

Aqui no cabe el Arte
First presented at the XXIII Salón de Artistas Nacionales (1972) in Bogotá,  Aqui no cabe el Arte [Art Does Not Fit Here] by Caro was the only text based art of its kind among the forty four other works presented at the time. The piece was made of sixteen white poster boards with a sharp, and angular letter written in bold in the center of each poster. Each letter was placed side by side and together measured eleven meters in length. Underneath each poster lies the name of a victim killed by tyrannical governmental forces in Colombia, mainly El Frente. Caro is attempting to use the power of written words to bring attention to political injustice.

Interpretation of Aqui no cabe el Arte
Caro`s piece Aqui no cabe el Arte comes in the wake of the election of Misael Pastrana Borrero as Colombia`s President. After taking office in 1970, Borrero began instituting martial law, and as a result began to suppress civil liberties. Forceful action used against organized political strikes as well as the elimination of popular local leaders became increasingly numerous during Borrero`s term. As a result of the political atmosphere in Colombia, Caro created the work to highlight the many atrocities being committed at the time. Some of the most well known events include the murder of university student, Romulo Carvahlo during the presidency of Carlos Lleras Restrepo. Carvahlo`s death is described by Caro to be an antecedent for the massacre of students after an organized insurrection during Borrero`s term as president. Furthermore, also mentioned in the work is the brutal massacre of Guahibo indigenous peoples in Colombia`s Planas region. Among others, these two events struck Caro as noteworthy for people to bring their attention too and as a result were a big reason behind the creation of the piece.

El imperialismo es un tigre de papel
Originally exhibited in 1973 at the Nombres nuevos en el arte de Colombia [New Names in the Art of Colombia] El imperialismo es un tigre de papel [Imperialism is a Paper Tiger] was the recreation of Mao Tse Tung’s famous expression “Imperialism is a Paper Tiger.” The work is a red banner made of silk, typically used in protests. Painted on the banner were large white letters, forming Mao`s famous statement. Additionally, on each side of the banner Caro placed a total of twelve silhouette tigers to effectively use environmental spaces at the exhibit. The action of setting up the individual tigers was captured in a famous photograph taken of the work by reporters at La Republica.

Interpretation of El imperialismo es un tigre de papel
Caro`s reinstatement of Mao`s saying was created to bring light to the influence of Mao`s Little Red book to the establishing of new ideas among young Colombians. As said by Caro  “The phrase came to me by inertia, through the context. What I did was convert the phrase into a palpable thing.” While still fresh from the creation of Aqui no cabe el Arte, Caro wanted to use the momentum of his previous success to reenact a political critique while bringing in new ideas he had felt were politically relevant.

Colombia-Marlboro
In 1973 Caro began the Marlboro project aimed at criticizing growing consumerism in Colombia. The Colombia-Marlboro project refers to a number of distinct pieces that are redesigns of Marlboro`s trademark logo with "Colombia" put in place of Marlboro. One of the most widely known pieces of this project was presented by Caro at Agudelo's gallery and was made from white cardstock and red tissue paper. Underneath the piece hung a series of flags with the Marlboro design as well as Caro`s name put in place of the word Marlboro.

Interpretation of Colombia-Marlboro
The purpose of Caro`s project was to highlight the growing consumer mentality he was beginning to see expand in Colombia. In order to do so he wanted to use the advertising system against major industrial powers. Although the project seemingly addresses smokers, the actual intent of the work was pertaining to a larger globalization movement that Caro was passionate about. In a statement about the project Caro described some of the main ideas he wished to bring to light "I am not a sociologist, nor a historian, nor any of those things, but I am a myopic; this allows me to see many things from reality like for instance, that in that epoch there were a lot of people selling Marlboro on the street. From there came the proposal that consisted in fusing the design of Marlboro and the word Colombia."

Colombia-Coca-Cola
Originally shown at the Lapiz y Papel exhibition by Jonier Marín in 1976. The work was a graphite drawing resembling the famous Coca-Cola style logo but in place of the Coca-Cola name was written “Colombia” in the same font. Later that same year Caro recreated the artwork and presented it to the XXVI Salón Nacional de Artistas. This time the piece was made from metal to better resemble Coca-Cola advertising signs. Furthermore, Colombia was painted onto the metal rather than drawn.

Interpretation of Colombia-Coca-Cola
Similarly to the context behind Colombia-Marlboro. Caro wanted to highlight the growing consumerism in Colombia that he felt was bringing forth capitalist and imperialist pressures on Colombian identity. Due to the positive feedback he had received after the Marlboro Project, Caro decided to continue the use of advertisement manipulation in order to further the spread of his ideas. Similar works were also taking place in nearby Latin American countries such as Brazil. Although it is not known whether Cildo Meireles' Coca-Cola Project in 1970 had any effect on Caro, the similarities are helpful in understanding the greater context for advertisement based pieces. Caro's overarching desire for the piece was for it to be a symbol of the “Americanization” of Colombian industry. Caro at the time felt as if the Colombian government had essentially sold itself to the hands of American industrial giants such as Coca-Cola.

Solo shows 
2012
 "En Montería, todo está muy caro", Museo Zenú de Arte Contemporáneo, Montería, Colombia

2010
 Antes de Cuiabá, Galería Casas Riegner, Bogotá, Colombia
2008
 Antonio Caro, Museo Antropológico y de Arte Contemporáneo
(MAAC) Guayaquil, Ecuador
2007

Encuentro Internacional Medellín, Medellín, Colombia 
 Workshop in Cali, Universidad Javeriana, Cali Colombia
2006
 Workshop in Manizales, Universidad de Claldas
 Workshop Corumbá, Invited by the Festival de América do Sud TODO ESTÁ MUY CARO 
 Exposición antológica de Antonio Caro, Sala RG, Fundación Celarg, Caracas, Venezuela
2003
 TODO ESTÁ MUY CARO, Retrospective 1970–2002, Museo de La Ciudad, Quito, Ecuador
2002
 TODO ESTÁ MUY CARO, Retrospective 1970–2002, Museo de Arte Moderno La Tertulia, Cali, Colombia
 Los Trabajos del Taller, Centro Cultural Comfandi, Cali, Colombia
2001
 Los Trabajos del Taller, Galería Santa Fe, Bogotá, Colombia
2000 
 Talleres en México, Centro de Información Cultural de México, Bogotá, Colombia
1998
 Muestra de trabajos, Museo de Arte Moderno, Bogotá, Colombia 
 Itinerancia del taller, Convenio Andrés Bello, Bogotá, Colombia 
 TODO ESTÁ MUY CARO, Banco de la República, Medellín, Colombia 
 Museo de Arte Moderno, Bucaramanga, Colombia
1997
 Installations, Galería Santa Fe, Bogotá, Colombia 
 TODO ESTÁ MUY CARO, Banco de la República, Pereira, Colombia
1996
 TODO ESTÁ MUY CARO, Banco de la República, Cúcuta, Colombia
 Museo Tayrona, Santa Marta, Colombia
 Teatro Amira de la Rosa, Barranquilla, Colombia
1994
 Killkawawa, Museo de “La Bagatela”, Cúcuta, Colombia
 Biblioteca Luis Ángel Arango, Bogotá, Colombia
1993
 Proyecto Postal, Galería Santa Fe, Bogotá, Colombia 
1992	
 Proyecto Quinientos, Galería Círculo, Bogotá, Colombia
1991	
 Presentation talk of “Proyecto Quinientos”, Museo de Bellas Artes, Caracas, Venezuela
 Museo Jesús Soto, Ciudad Bolívar, Venezuela
1990
 Muestra Antológica, Museo de Arte Moderno, Cartagena, Colombia 
1989	
 Presentation talk of “Proyecto Quinientos”, Centro de Artes, Quito, Ecuador
 Pontificia Universidad, Cuenca, Ecuador
 Casa de la Cultura, Guayaquil, Ecuador
1987
 Audiovisual, Nosferatu, Barranco, Lima, Perú 
 Maíz, Museo de Arte, Universidad Nacional, Bogotá, Colombia
1984
 Ven a Firmar, Galería Artes, Quito, Ecuador
1983
 Maíz, Biblioteca Pública Piloto, Medellín, Colombia 
1982	
 Cuadernos de Poesía, Museo de Arte Moderno, Bogotá, Colombia
1980
 Caro, Museo de Arte y Cultura popular, Cuiaba, Brasil 
1978	
 Homenaje a Manuel Quintín Lame, Centro de Arte Actual, Pereira, Colombia
1974
 Defienda su Talento, Galería Belarca, Bogotá, Colombia 
1973	
 El Imperialismo es un Tigre de Papel, Galería Barrios, Barranquilla, Colombia 
 Colombia – Marlboro, Galería San Diego, Bogotá, Colombia

Selected group shows 
2002
 Naturaleza y Paisaje, Museo de Arte Moderno La Tertulia, Cali, Colombia 
 Texto y Textualidad, Museo de Arte Moderno La Tertulia, Cali, Colombia
2000
 Define “Context”, A.P.E.X., New York, Estados Unidos.
1999	
 Arte Correo, Museo de Filatelia, Oaxaca, México
 Global Conceptualism, Queens Museum, New York, Estados Unidos 
 Lugar de Enlace, Centro Colombo-Venezolano de Cultura, Bogotá, Colombia
1998
 Fragilidad, Museo de Arte Universidad Nacional, Bogotá, Colombia
1997
 Sellos, Galería Santa Fe, Bogotá, Colombia
1995
 Comportamiento del Paisaje, Museo de Arte Moderno La Tertulia, Cali, Colombia
1994
 Esto no es una Pipa, Casa Wiedemann, Bogotá, Colombia 
1992	
 Por Humor al Arte, Biblioteca Luis Ángel Arango, Bogotá, Colombia
1988
 Libro Objeto por Correo, EI Archivero, México D.F, México 
 I Bienal de Arte Joven, Museo de Arte Moderno, Bogotá, Colombia 
1987	
 Proyecto Quinientos, XXXI Salón de Artistas Nacionales, Medellín, Colombia
1985
 Barney, Caro, Echeverri, Biblioteca Pública Piloto, Medellín, Colombia
1980
 Artes Para los Años Ochenta, Museo de Arte Moderno La Tertulia, Cali, Colombia
1977
 Los Novísimos Colombianos, Museo de Arte Contemporáneo, Caracas, Venezuela.
1976
 XXVI Salón Nacional de Artistas, Museo Nacional, Bogotá, Colombia
 Lápiz y Papel, Museo de Arte Moderno, Bogotá, Colombia
1975
 I Salón Atenas, Museo de Arte Moderno, Bogotá, Colombia
1974
 Latin American Week, I.C.A., London, England
1973
 Nuevos Nombres, Museo de Arte Moderno, Bogotá, Colombia
1972
 VI Salón de Agosto, Museo de Arte Contemporáneo, Bogotá, Colombia
 III Bienal de Medellín, Medellín, Colombia
1971
 I Bienal Americana de Artes Gráficas, Museo de Arte Moderno La Tertulia, Cali, Colombia
1970
 XXI Salón Nacional, Museo Nacional, Bogotá, Colombia

Distinctions 
1999
 Nominated for the Premio Luis Caballero 211 Versión, Instituto Distrital de Cultura y Turismo, Bogotá, Colombia
1998
 Scholarship for Artistic Residencies Colombia – México
1998
 Guggenheim Scholarship
1996
 Creation Scholarship, Colcultura
1992
 Creation Scholarship, Colcultura
1987
 Honourable Mention, XXXI Salón Nacional de Artistas, Medellín, Colombia
1976
 Medal, XXXVI Salón Nacional de Artistas, Bogotá, Colombia
1972
 Bolsa de trabajo, VI Salón de Agosto, Museo de Arte Contemporáneo, Bogotá, Colombia

Collections 
 Tate Modern, London, England, UK
 Banco de la República, Colombia 
 Museo de Arte Moderno, Bogotá, Colombia
 La Tertulia Museum, Cali, Colombia. 
 Museo de Arte Moderno, Pereira, Colombia. 
 Queens Museum, Queens, New York, U.S.A.
 Blanton Museum of Art, Austin, Texas, USA

Bibliography

References

External links
 Sullivan, Edward J.,  Latin American Art in the Twentieth-Century. Phaidon Press Limited; London, 1996. pg. 177.
 Mosquera, Gerado, Beyond the Fantastic: Contemporary Art Criticism from Latin America, MIT Press, 1996.
 Camnitzer, Luis, Conceptualism in Latin American Art: Didactics of Liberation, University of Texas Press, Austin, TX,  2007.
 Camnitzer, Luis, Antonio Caro: guerrillero visual, Revista Poliéster,  1995.
 Bossa, Paula,  Thesis: A ‘revision’ of Antonio Caro’s formative period : 1970—1976, University of Texas Digital Repository, 2011.
 Gómez Echeverri, Nicolás. Colombia y el arte Pop. Exposición Andy Warhol Mr. America. Subgerencia cultural Banco de la República, 2009
 Ospina, Lucas. Ahí viene el lobo. Revista Arcadia, 23 de mayo de 2014

Colombian painters
Colombian male painters
Contemporary painters
1950 births
2021 deaths
People from Bogotá